Nankang is a district of the city of Ganzhou in southern Jiangxi province. It was a county-level city until November 2013, when the State Council made it a district of Ganzhou.

Administration
Nankang has a population of 810,000. It covers an area of 1796 square kilometers. The seat of the district is at Rongjiang Town.

In the present, Nankang District has 2 subdistricts, 8 towns, 11 townships and 1 ethnic township.
2 subdistricts
 Rongjiang
 Dongshan

8 towns

11 townships

1 ethnic township
 Chitu She Ethnic Township

Climate

Transportation
Ganzhou West railway station is located here.

References

External links

Nankang Government website

County-level divisions of Jiangxi
Ganzhou